was a town located in Yuri District, Akita Prefecture, Japan.

In 2003, the town had an estimated population of 5,883 and a density of 60.94 persons per km². The total area was 96.53 km².

On March 22, 2005, Yuri, along with the city of Honjō; and the towns of Chōkai, Higashiyuri, Iwaki, Nishime, Ōuchi and Yashima (all from Yuri District), merged to create the city of Yurihonjō.

Notable people
Ryōzō Katō
Akira Komatsu

External links
Yuri official website 

Dissolved municipalities of Akita Prefecture
Yurihonjō